Vintage FM is a low-powered open narrowcast radio station based in Western Sydney. Vintage FM broadcasts on  88.7 MHz in the Camden and Wollondilly regions. The station plays a mix of music from the 1950s, ’60s and ’70s.

The station commenced broadcasting in Penrith on 1 January 2009. The station has also previously broadcast into the Blue Mountains, Hawkesbury & Southern Highlands as well as the VAST network - these have all since ceased.

In 2014, Vintage FM commenced transmissions to Camden on 88.7FM and continue to this day. It also broadcasts to a large audience through its website, app and on the iheartradio app.

Transmissions into Penrith on 87.8FM ceased in May 2021. In 2022, Vintage FM was sold to Dawson Street Media, operators of 1629am Newcastle.

Airstaff
The current on-air team includes Kevin Graham, John Bond, Wayne Wilmington. Former announcers include Grizzly Adams, Ross Hutchison, Terry Diomis, Graham Webb, Ian Macrae, Nicki Gillis, Malama Psaranios, Josh Haizer, David Archer, Jason Bouman and Kerry Denten.

External links
 Official website

Radio stations in Sydney
Radio stations in New South Wales
Nostalgia radio stations
Radio stations established in 2006